Roko is a Croatian masculine given name, cognate to Italian Rocco and Slovene Rok. It is related to the veneration of Saint Roch.

Notable people with the name include:

 Roko Badžim (born 1997), Croatian basketball player
 Roko Baturina (born 2000), Croatian football player
 Roko Belic, an American film director, producer, cinematographer, and actor
 Roko Blažević (born 2000), Croatian singer
 Roko Glasnović (born 1978), Croatian cleric
 Roko Jureškin (born 2000), Croatian football player
 Roko Karanušić (born 1982), Croatian tennis player
 Roko Mišlov (born 1988), Croatian football player
 Roko Pelicarić (born 1998), Croatian water polo player
 Roko Prkačin (born 2002), Croatian basketball player
 Roko Strika (born 1994), Australian football player of Croatian descent
 Roko Šimić (born 2003), Croatian football player
 Roko Tošić (born 1979), Croatian table tennis player
 Roko Ukić (born 1984), Croatian basketball player

Croatian masculine given names